Laci Mosley is an American actress, comedian and podcaster. She performs improv comedy at UCB Los Angeles and co-starred in the Pop comedy series Florida Girls. Mosley is best known for her podcast Scam Goddess, which focuses on historical and contemporary scams and cons. In 2021, Mosley joined the cast of HBO's A Black Lady Sketch Show and the iCarly revival series.

Career

Acting and comedy 

Mosley's first lead acting role was on the 2019 Pop series Florida Girls, which was cancelled after one season despite an initial renewal. She has also acted in supporting roles on Single Parents, Insecure, and The Wedding Year. She is set to star in the upcoming digital series Scroll Wheel of Time on Eko.

Mosley provides commentary on Whoopi Goldberg's ABC true crime series The Con (2020).

In 2021, she joined the main cast of A Black Lady Sketch Show's second season. That year, she was also cast in the main role of Harper in the iCarly revival. After the announcement of her casting, Mosley was the target of racist attacks from fans who saw her as a replacement for Jennette McCurdy's character from the original. Writer Franchesca Ramsey tweeted in response, "Laci's character Harper isn't replacing Sam. No one could replace Jennette McCurdy or her incredible talent! But it’s both racist as hell & completely unfair to decide that Laci hasn’t earned her role especially since the show isn’t even out yet!!"

Mosley performs improv and sketch comedy at UCB in Los Angeles and performs a show called #TrapProv with her comedy partner Priscilla Davies. She is a member of UCB's initiative Project Rethink that started in 2020, which works to address systemic racism within the organization.

In 2021, Mosley appeared as a panelist on four episodes of the NPR news quiz Wait Wait... Don't Tell Me!

In March 2022 it was announced that she would not return for season three of A Black Lady Sketch Show due to scheduling conflicts. In April, she was cast in a recurring role in the NBC comedy pilot Lopez vs Lopez.

Scam Goddess 
In September 2019, Mosley created the podcast Scam Goddess, produced by Earwolf, where she discusses historic and modern cons with other comedian guests. The name comes from a moniker given to her by the hosts of The Daily Zeitgeist podcast due to her frequent internet research on scam and fraud cases. Topics covered include the Fyre Festival and Hilaria Baldwin's claims that she is of Spanish descent. The podcast was recommended by Vox and Vulture. Sean Malin of Vulture wrote in positive review, "Mosley is whip-fast with jokes, upstaging and amusing even her funniest guests with zingers." In October 2020, the podcast was picked up for co-production by Conan O'Brien's company Team Coco, alongside Earwolf. Mosley received two Webby Awards and an iHeartRadio Podcast Award for Scam Goddess.

Personal life 
Mosley was born in Terrell, Texas and raised in Dallas. She went to Liberty High School in Frisco, Texas and was involved with several campus groups.  She is a graduate of the University of Pittsburgh. Upon graduating, she lived in New York City for two years then moved to Los Angeles to pursue acting. She identifies as bisexual.

Awards and nominations

For Scam Goddess 
 2021 –  Webby Awards, Crime & Justice Podcast
 2022 – iHeart Radio Podcast Awards, Best Crime Podcast
 2022 – Webby Awards, Crime & Justice Podcast

Filmography

Television

Film

References

External links 

Laci Mosley on UCBcomedy.com
Laci Mosley on Instagram
Scam Goddess on Earwolf.com

Year of birth missing (living people)
Living people
21st-century African-American women
21st-century African-American people
African-American actresses
African-American female comedians
American women comedians
American podcasters
Upright Citizens Brigade Theater performers
Actresses from Dallas
Comedians from Texas
Bisexual actresses
LGBT African Americans
LGBT people from Texas
American women podcasters
Entertainers from Dallas
American bisexual actors
University of Pittsburgh alumni
Bisexual comedians
American LGBT comedians